Batapur is a Town near the city of Lahore, Pakistan. It was established as a residence for the workers of Bata shoe factory. The international airport is the Allama Iqbal International Airport in Lahore is on 20 minutes drive through Lahore Ring Road. This was ruined once during the Indo-Pakistan War of 1965 and Indo-Pakistan War of 1971.

References

Wagha Town
Company towns in Pakistan
Bata Corporation